Listen Now is the only studio album by 801, whose live debut was released in November 1976. For this release, the group was officially billed as "Phil Manzanera/801".

Background
In 1977, hoping to capitalise on the success of 801 Live, a revised version of 801 (now known as Phil Manzanera/801) recorded and released a studio album with additional collaborating musicians including Kevin Godley and Lol Creme of 10cc, and Tim Finn and Eddie Rayner of Split Enz. The album is mainly the work of Phil Manzanera and Bill MacCormick, with contributions from Francis Monkman, Simon Phillips and Eno. Lloyd Watson left the project altogether. Vocal duties were shared by Simon Ainley and MacCormick. Many of the same personnel were to contribute to Manzanera's album of the following year, K-Scope.

The album was first rereleased on CD by EG Records without bonus tracks and in 2000 by Virgin with three tracks previously unavailable. The "Flight 19" b-side "Car Rhumba" was rereleased on the CD version of Phil Manzanera's Diamond Head as "Carhumba". One track, "Rude Awakening", was a leftover from the original session, while the remaining two tracks ("Blue Gray Uniform" and "Remote Control") are demos recorded at PLS studios. "Remote Control" was re-recorded and ended up on Manzanera's 1978 album K-Scope.

Track listing

1977 LP track listing

Side One
"Listen Now" (Bill MacCormick, Ian MacCormick, Phil Manzanera) - 7:56
"Flight 19" (Ian MacCormick, Manzanera) -  5:33
"Island" (Manzanera) - 5:20
"Law and Order" (Bill MacCormick, Manzanera) - 4:06

Side Two
"¿Que?" (Manzanera) - 1:18
"City of Light" (Bill MacCormick, Manzanera) - 7:09
"Initial Speed" (Manzanera) - 4:44
"Postcard Love" (Bill MacCormick, Manzanera) - 4:34
"That Falling Feeling" (Ian MacCormick, Manzanera) - 5:15

2000 Virgin CD version
"Listen Now" (Bill MacCormick, Ian MacCormick, Phil Manzanera) - 7:57
"Flight 19" (Ian MacCormick, Manzanera) -  5:28
"Island" (Manzanera) - 5:18
"Law and Order" (Bill MacCormick, Manzanera) - 4:07
"Rude Awakening" (Manzanera) - 1:10
"¿Que?" (Manzanera) - 1:18
"City of Light" (Bill MacCormick, Manzanera) - 7:09
"Initial Speed" (Manzanera) - 4:44
"Postcard Love" (Bill MacCormick, Manzanera) - 4:34
"That Falling Feeling" (Ian MacCormick, Manzanera) - 5:15
"Blue Gray Uniform" (Peter Wheeler) - 2:54
"Remote Control" (Ian MacCormick) - 4:15

Charts

Personnel
Phil Manzanera - guitar, acoustic piano, Hammond organ
Eno - guitar treatment, chorus piano, synthesizer
Simon Ainley - lead vocals
Bill MacCormick - bass, vocals
Ian MacCormick - vocals
Tim Finn - vocals
Kevin Godley - vocals, percussion
Lol Creme - vocals, Gizmo
Billy Livsey - clavinet, Wurlitzer electric piano, Fender Rhodes electric piano
Mel Collins - soprano saxophone
John White - tuba
Eddie Jobson - acoustic piano, Fender Rhodes electric piano
Eddie Rayner - acoustic piano
Francis Monkman - Fender Rhodes electric piano, synthesizer
Rhett Davies - Hammond organ
Simon Phillips - drums, percussion
Dave Mattacks - drums
Alan Lee - background vocals/chorus
Technical
Martin Lawrence, Rhett Davies - engineer
Philip Castle - design, design concept

References

801 (band) albums
1977 albums
Albums produced by Phil Manzanera
Polydor Records albums
E.G. Records albums